Air Vice Marshal Sir Charles Laverock Lambe,  (10 May 1875 – 25 April 1953) was a distinguished officer in the Royal Navy and a foundational commander in the Royal Air Force (RAF) on its creation in 1918. Lambe was one of the most senior officers with naval experience to serve in the 1920s RAF.

Biography
Joining the Royal Navy in 1889, Lambe attended the training ship Britannia. In 1897 he was promoted to lieutenant and served aboard HMS Magpie, taking part in Rear Admiral Rawson's punitive expedition to Benin.  Lambe later served at the Naval Ordnance Department as an assistant to the Director of Naval Ordnance and Torpedoes. Promoted to Commander in 1908 he was again appointed an assistant to the Director of Naval Ordnance in 1913.

In August 1914, Lambe was appointed as captain of the seaplane carrier HMS Hermes, which sank after being torpedoed in October of the same year.  At the start of August 1916, having just been promoted to wing captain, Lambe took up appointment as the officer commanding the Royal Naval Air Service's Dover Command which included RNAS units at Dunkirk. During his time at the Dover Command, Lambe's aircraft carried out bombing raids on the German submarine harbours at Bruges. On 1 April 1918, Lambe was appointed General Officer Commanding the VII Brigade of the RAF.  On 23 April, Lambe's VII Brigade carried out air attacks as part of the blocking of Zeebrugge and Ostend. On 9 May, Lambe was once again the air commander in a naval action, this time for the Second Ostend Raid.

In 1919 Lambe was selected by Sir Hugh Trenchard to sit on the Air Council and in 1924 he was appointed commandant of the RAF's No. 1 School of Technical Training. In 1928 Lambe was appointed Air Officer Commanding Coastal Area (the forerunner of Coastal Command) from where he retired in the rank of air vice marshal in 1931. Lambe died on 25 April 1953.

References

External links
 Air of Authority—A History of RAF Organisation—AVM Lambe
 Profile

1875 births
1953 deaths
Royal Air Force air marshals
Royal Air Force generals of World War I
Royal Navy officers
Knights Commander of the Order of the Bath
Companions of the Order of St Michael and St George
Companions of the Distinguished Service Order
Officiers of the Légion d'honneur
Knights of the Order of the Crown (Belgium)
Recipients of the Croix de guerre (Belgium)
Recipients of the Croix de Guerre 1914–1918 (France)
Foreign recipients of the Distinguished Service Medal (United States)
Royal Navy officers of World War I
British military personnel of the Benin Expedition of 1897
Recipients of the Navy Distinguished Service Medal